The 1st Mountain Division was an elite formation of the German Wehrmacht during World War II, and is remembered for its involvement in multiple large-scale war crimes.
It was created on 9 April 1938 in Garmisch Partenkirchen from the Mountain Brigade which was itself formed on 1 June 1935. The division consisted mainly of Bavarians and some Austrians.

Poland and France
The 1st Mountain Division fought in the Invasion of Poland as a part of Army Group South and distinguished itself during fighting in the Carpathians and at Lwów. On 8 September 1939 in Rozdziel village its soldiers committed a war crime (killing 6 civilians and 3 POWs, burning houses) and attempting to execute another 250 civilians.

It subsequently took part in the Battle of France as a part of XVIII Army Corps and was selected to take part in the planned operations against the United Kingdom (Operation Sea Lion) and Gibraltar (Operation Felix) but both operations were cancelled. With Felix cancelled, the division took part in the Invasion of Yugoslavia in April 1941 as part of the 2nd Army.

Eastern Front and Balkans 

The 1st Mountain Division participated in Operation Barbarossa, (the invasion of the Soviet Union). On 30 June, the division captured Lviv. There, the Germans discovered several thousand bodies of prisoners who had been executed by the NKVD, as they could not be evacuated.

The 1st Mountain Division continued its advance into the Soviet Union, participating in the breakthrough of the Stalin Line and the advance to the Dniepr and Mius rivers. In May 1942, the division  fought in the Second Battle of Kharkov and then participated in the offensive through southern Russia and into the Caucasus (Operation Edelweiss).

In a symbolic propaganda move, the division sent a detachment to raise the German flag on Mount Elbrus on 21 August. Although the feat was widely publicized by Goebbels, Hitler was furious over what he called "these crazy mountain climbers," his rage lasting for hours. However, by December 1942 with Soviet forces en-circling the 6th Army at Stalingrad, the 1st Mountain Division, as part of the 17th Army, was ordered to withdraw to the Kuban bridgehead.

In April 1943, the division was posted to Yugoslavia, where it participated in the anti-Partisan offensive named Case Black, and later Greece where it took part in anti-partisan operations. In November 1943, the division returned to Yugoslavia, where it took part in operations Operation Kugelblitz, Schneesturm and Waldrausch. In March 1944, the division was engaged in the Operation Margarethe (German occupation of Hungary). After Operation Rübezahl in Yugoslavia in August 1944, the division took part in defensive fighting against the Red Army in the Belgrade Offensive, and suffered severe losses. During the operation, the division commander, General Stettner, was killed in the battle on 17 October on Avala mountain near Belgrade. In late November, it was transferred in Baranja, to the most endangered spot of the German defense.

It was renamed 1. Volks-Gebirgs-Division in March 1945. Its final major operations were near Lake Balaton (Operation Spring Awakening) against the 3rd Ukrainian Front. Two months later the division surrendered to the Americans in Austria.

War crimes

During the Invasion of Poland, soldiers from the division assisted in the round-up of Jewish civilians from Przemyśl for forced labour, and photos of this were printed in newspapers. Photos 7 and 8

During the Case Black operation in Yugoslavia, the division and other units committed crimes against prisoners of war and civilians. In the after-battle report on 10 July, the division reported that it took 498 prisoners, 411 of whom were shot.

On 6 July 1943 a unit from the division attacked the village of Borovë in Albania. All of the houses and buildings were completely burned or otherwise destroyed. Among the 107 inhabitants killed were five entire families. The youngest victim was aged four months, and the oldest 73.

On 25 July 1943, soldiers from the division attacked the village of Mousiotitsa in Greece after a cache of weapons was found nearby, killing 153 civilians. On 16 August 1943, the village of Kommeno was attacked on the orders of Oberstleutnant Josef Salminger, the commander of GebirgsJäger Regiment 98. A total of 317 civilians were killed.

The 1st Mountain Division murdered 5,200 Italian soldiers from the 33rd Infantry Division "Acqui" in September 1943 on the Greek island of Cefalonia after they had surrendered. The division also  executed all officers and non-commissioned officers of the 151st Infantry Division "Perugia", who had surrendered in Albania in early October 1943.

After the killing of Oberstleutnant Josef Salminger by Greek partisans, the commander of XXII Gebirgs-Armeekorps General der Gebirgstruppe Hubert Lanz ordered, on 1 October 1943, a “ruthless retaliatory action” in a 20 km area around the place where Salminger had been attacked. In the village of Lyngiades, 92 of its 96 residents were executed.

The division's war crimes are described in H. F. Meyer's book Bloodstained Edelweiss: The 1st Mountain Division in the Second World War.

Commanders
 General der Gebirgstruppe Ludwig Kübler (1 Sep 1939 – 25 October 1940)
 General der Gebirgstruppe Hubert Lanz (25 Oct 1940 – 17 Dec 1942)
 Generalleutnant Walter Stettner Ritter von Grabenhofen (17 Dec 1942 – 18 October 1944)
 Generalmajor August Wittmann  (19. October 1944 – December 1944)
 Generalleutnant Josef Kübler (27 Dec 1944 – 10 March 1945)
 Generalleutnant August Wittmann (17 Mar 1945 – 8 May 1945)

Order of battle

1939
 98. Mountain Infantry Regiment
 3 Battalions
 99. Mountain Infantry Regiment
 3 Battalions
 100. Mountain Infantry Regiment
 3 Battalions
 4. Panzerabwehr (anti-tank) Battalion
 79. Mountain Artillery Regiment
 4 Battalions
 54. Signals Battalion
 54. Pioneer Battalion
 54. Supply Troops
 Service Troops

1941
 98. Mountain Infantry Regiment
 3 Battalions
 99. Mountain Infantry Regiment
 3 Battalions
 54. Field Medical Battalion
 44. Panzerabwehr Battalion
 79. Mountain Artillery Regiment
 4 Battalions
 54. Signals Battalion
 54. Pioneer Battalion
 54. Supply Troops
 Service Troops

1943
 98. Mountain Infantry Regiment
 3 Battalions
 99. Mountain Infantry Regiment
 3 Battalions
 44. Panzerjäger Battalion
 79. Mountain Artillery Regiment
 4 Battalions
 54. Mountain Jäger Battalion
 54. Reconnaissance Battalion
 54. Mountain Signals Battalion
 79. Mountain Field Medical Battalion
 54. Mountain Pioneer Battalion
 54. Mountain Pack Mule Battalion
 54. Supply Troops
 Service Troops

Notable members
 Ferdinand Schörner War criminal and the last living German field marshal, holder of the Knight's Cross with Oak Leaves, Swords and Diamonds
 Wego Chiang son of the Chinese leader General Chiang Kai-shek served in I./Gebirgsjäger-Regiment 98 in 1937 – 1939, reaching the rank of Leutnant before returning to China at the outbreak of war.

Footnotes

References 
 
 Hubert Lanz, Max Pemsel: Gebirgsjäger. Die 1. Gebirgs-Division 1935–1945. Podzun, Bad Nauheim 1954.
 Hermann Frank Meyer: Blutiges Edelweiß. Die 1. Gebirgs-Division im Zweiten Weltkrieg, Ch. Links Verlag, Berlin 2008, . (Online).
 Hermann Frank Meyer: Kommeno. Erzählende Rekonstruktion eines Wehrmachtsverbrechens in Griechenland. Romiosini, Köln 1999, .
 
 
 Ralph Klein, Regina Mentner & Stephan Stracke (2004), Mörder unterm Edelweiss: Dokumentation des Hearings zu den Kriegsverbrechen der Gebirgsjäger, 

1
Military units and formations established in 1938
Military units and formations disestablished in 1945
1938 establishments in Germany
1945 disestablishments in Germany
Nazi war crimes in Poland
Nazi war crimes in Greece
Military units and formations of Germany in Yugoslavia in World War II
Axis war crimes in Yugoslavia
War crimes of the Wehrmacht